"Break" is a song by Kero Kero Bonito, being the third single from their first studio album Bonito Generation (2016).

Background and release

"Break" was released on 13 June 2016. The Jonah Baseball remix was released as a part of the EP Bonito Retakes (Remixes) on 30 May 2017.

Music video
The official video for the song was released on 7 March 2016 and uploaded to YouTube. The video features Sarah Midori Perry "taking a break" (i.e., sitting still) on a chair in various contexts and locations.

Reception
Leah Levinson of Tiny Mix Tapes wrote that the song "find[s] Sarah at her most charismatic pseudo-naivety, as she narrates her carefree navigation of the world ... The outspoken ambivalence of her character is essential to her performance of both the cute and the zany."

Release history

References

2016 singles
2016 songs
Kero Kero Bonito songs